Party Central is a 2013 American computer animated short film produced by Pixar Animation Studios for Walt Disney Pictures and directed by Kelsey Mann. It premiered on August 9, 2013 at the D23 Expo in Anaheim, California and was shown in theaters with Muppets Most Wanted on March 21, 2014. Party Central is the second short in the Monsters, Inc. franchise and takes place shortly after the events of Monsters University. The short involves Mike and Sulley helping their Oozma Kappa fraternity brothers make their party a success. It is the only Monsters, Inc. production to be rated PG by the MPA.

Plot
Mike and Sulley are visiting Monsters University for the weekend to see how their Oozma Kappa fraternity brothers are doing. The group is throwing its first party, but no one has shown up. Fortunately, Mike and Sulley have a plan to liven up the house, to which using a borrowed door station, they sneak into a party at the Roar Omega Roar fraternity and steal all of its food and guests to fill the Oozma Kappa house. The supply runs take them through the closet doors of a married couple's bedroom, repeatedly disturbing their sleep.

Once they have the party fully stocked, Scott "Squishy" Squibbles' mother Sherri walks in on it while doing a load of laundry. She is angry with the fraternity, but only because they did not invite her. After lighting a bonfire on the lawn, Sherri introduces the crowd to "door jumping"/"door jamming", involving jumping from the roof with the help of two doors to land safely on the lawn. The guests congratulate the Oozma Kappas for throwing a great party, and many of them decide to pledge the fraternity.

In a post-credits scene, the husband and wife wake their son Timmy up and ask if they can sleep with him, saying that there are monsters in their closet. Timmy vehemently replies, "That's what I've been trying to tell you!".

Voice cast

 Billy Crystal as Mike
 John Goodman as Sulley
 Peter Sohn as Squishy
 Julia Sweeney as Sherri 
 Charlie Day as Art
 Nathan Fillion as Johnny
 Dave Foley as Terry
 Sean P. Hayes as Terri 
 Bobby Moynihan as Chet 
 Joel Murray as Don 
 Colleen O'Shaughnessey as Mom
 James Kevin Ward as Dad
 Cristina Pucelli as Timmy

Production
According to the short's writer/director Kelsey Mann, "When you first meet the Oozma Kappas, they go to their fraternity house and the first thing they say is, 'Welcome to Party Central! We haven’t thrown a party yet, but when we do we’ll be ready,'... I kept telling [director] Dan [Scanlon], 'I really want to see their party. We have to do it in the credits or something.' Then when the idea of doing a short came up, we were like, 'That could be the party!'" The short took around eight months to make, to which the voices were recorded near end of production of Monsters University. Mann stated "We would do a couple of pickup lines with Billy Crystal and the other actors for the movie and then we’d get the stuff we needed for the short." Party Central was initially considered as a bonus feature for the Monsters University DVD, but the decision was later made to release the short theatrically. It was originally scheduled to be shown in theaters with The Good Dinosaur until the film was shifted from 2014 to 2015.

Release
Party Central premiered on August 9, 2013 at the D23 Expo in Anaheim, California and was shown in theaters with Muppets Most Wanted on March 21, 2014. Party Central received a PG rating from the MPAA for "some reckless behavior", the first Disney animated short to get higher than a G rating since 1990's Roller Coaster Rabbit.

The short was released for streaming on October 21, 2014, on the Disney Movies Anywhere application for iPhone and iPad, and on the Disney Movies Anywhere website.

Home media
Party Central was released on Blu-ray, DVD and digital download as part of Pixar Short Films Collection, Volume 3 on November 9, 2018.

Critical reception
After being screened at the D23 Expo, BigScreen Animation noted "judging from Twitter, the response was tremendous." Newsday said "It starts with a simple plot idea and escalates in classic comedy form." Rotoscopers wrote "This short film was a cool, funny idea. Not a story. It was literally a sequence of jokes with no emotional core whatsoever."

References

External links

  at Disney
  at Pixar
 
 

2013 films
2013 computer-animated films
2013 short films
2010s American animated films
2010s animated short films
2010s English-language films
2010s monster movies
Films about fraternities and sororities
Films directed by Kelsey Mann
Monsters, Inc.
Pixar short films